Ghagoki is a small village in Phalia Tehsil, Punjab (Pakistan) with a population of 2,500.

Villages in Phalia Tehsil
Villages in Mandi Bahauddin District